KDD may refer to:

 Khuzdar Airport (IATA code: KDD), Balochistan, Pakistan
 Knowledge discovery in databases, a form of data mining
 KDD – Kriminaldauerdienst (Berlin Crime Squad), a German television series broadcast from 2007 to 2010
 KDD Group, a Ukrainian real estate development company
 KDDI, a Japanese telecommunications company, formerly known as KDD
 Yankunytjatjara dialect (ISO 639:kdd)

See also
 Special Interest Group on Knowledge Discovery and Data Mining (SIGKDD)